Solvac is a Belgian holding founded in 1983, which groups the investments of the descendants of Ernest Solvay in Solvay of which it is the largest single shareholder with 30% of its shares. Jean-Pierre Delwart is President of the Board of Directors.

Sources
 Trends magazine, p. 66, 27 March 2008
 Solvac (Google finance)

External links
 Solvac

Financial services companies of Belgium
Companies based in Brussels